Burgundio of Pisa, sometimes erroneously styled "Burgundius", was a 12th century Italian jurist. He was an ambassador for Pisa at Constantinople in 1136. He was a professor in Paris, and assisted at the Lateran Council in 1179, dying at a very advanced age in 1193.

He was a distinguished Greek scholar, and is believed on the authority of Odofredus to have translated into Latin, soon after the Pandects were brought to Bologna, the various Greek fragments which occur in them, with the exception of those in the 27th book, the translation of which has been attributed to Modestinus. The Latin translations ascribed to Burgundio were received at Bologna as an integral part of the text of the Pandects, and form part of that known as The Vulgate in distinction from the Florentine text.

In addition, he translated from Greek into Latin Exposition of the Orthodox Faith by John of Damascus and also his Fountain of Wisdom, on request of Pope Eugene III; On human nature by Nemesius of Emesa; Galen's On complexions; Books 6-8 (on winemaking) of the Geoponica; and homilies on Matthew and John by John Chrysostom, as well as the first Latin translation of Aristotle's Nicomachaen Ethics (Ethica vetus).

References

External links
List of his translations in the Latin Vicipaedia

 The Chrysostomus Latinus in Iohannem Online (CLIO) Project is an Open Access resource providing Burgundio's translation of Chrysostom's 88 homilies on the Gospel of John (1173), which has never been printed, as well as the later Latin translations of Francesco Griffolini (1462) and Bernard de Montfaucon (1728), along with Montfaucon's critical edition of the original Greek text, which was reprinted in Patrologia Graeca.

 The Chrysostomus Latinus in Mattheum Online (CLIMO) Project is a new Open Access project that seeks to follow the successful format of the CLIO Project, and is currently preparing an Open Access transcription of Burgundio's translation of Chrysostom's 90 homilies on the Gospel of Matthew (1151), which was also never printed.

Bibliography
P. Classen, Burgundio von Pisa. Heidelberg, 1974.

Italian philosophers
Greek–Latin translators
1193 deaths
Year of birth unknown
12th-century Italian jurists
12th-century translators
12th-century Latin writers
12th-century Italian philosophers